This article lists the diplomatic missions in Somaliland. Somaliland is a de facto independent republic, but its independence remains unrecognised by any member state of the U.N. or any other international organisation.  All countries recognise Somaliland as part of Somalia. The capital city of Hargeisa hosts no embassies of U.N. member states, but at least three consulates and a number of liaison offices.

Consulates General/Consulates
 (Consulate General)
 (Consulate General)
 (Consulate General)

Representative offices
  
 (Liaison office)
 (Liaison office)
 (Representative Office)
 (Representative Office, to open)
 (Representative Office)

See also
Foreign relations of Somaliland
List of diplomatic missions of Somaliland

References

External links
 Somaliland Government

Foreign relations of Somaliland
Somaliland
Diplomatic missions
Somaliland
Diplomatic missions